The 2018–19 Armenia Basketball League A is the second season of the basketball first division of Armenia.

Artsakh are the defending champions.

Competition format
The regular season consists in a double-legged round-robin tournament where the six teams qualify for the playoffs.

Teams

Six teams will take part in the competition after the withdrawal of 3 teams -Engineer, Shirak and Grand Sport-,  and the admission of 2 teams -Aragats and Erebuni-.

Two teams were relocated: Urartu Vivaro from Yerevan to Vanadzor and Artsakh from Stepanakert to Yerevan.

Regular season

League table

Results

Playoffs
The playoffs are played in a best-of-seven format, with the series starting 1–1 or 2–0 depending on the head-to-head games in the regular season. The other five matches are played as 1-1-1-1-1.

Final will be played in a best-of-nine format with the same format as in the previous series.

Bracket

Quarter-finals

|}

Semi-finals

|}

Finals

|}

Final standings

References

External links
Armenian basketball at Eurobasket.com
League A at Facebook
Basketball Federation of Armenia at Facebook

Armenian
Armenia Basketball League A